U.S. Route 77 (US 77) is a major north–south United States Numbered Highway which extends for  in the central United States. As of 2005, Its southern terminus is in Brownsville, Texas, at Veteran's International Bridge on the Mexican border, where it connects with both Mexican Federal Highway 101 and Mexican Federal Highway 180, and the highway's northern terminus is in Sioux City, Iowa, at an interchange with Interstate 29 (I-29).

It is unsigned in and around Dallas, Texas. Its historic segment through South Dakota and Minnesota was decommissioned with the advent of I-29 but otherwise the route has been spared the decommissioning that has shortened other US Highways. The route has major freeway sections in Oklahoma City including the Broadway Extension connecting suburban Edmond to downtown Oklahoma City.

Route description

Texas

|-
|TX
|
|-
|OK
|
|-
|KS
|
|-
|NE
|
|-
|IA
|
|-
|Total
|
|}

The section between the Oklahoma–Texas state line and Waco is mostly co-located with I-35 and the I-35E branch through Dallas, and where it is co-located, it is not signed.

The two stretches in Texas that are not co-located are a stretch wholly within the city of Denton and a longer stretch from near Red Oak, to Hillsboro, the reason being that US 77 is a separate road between the two, serving the town of Waxahachie.

As of 2004, US 77 Alternate has a northern terminus in Hallettsville, Texas.  It rejoins US 77 at Refugio, Texas. While the main line of US 77 passes through Victoria, Alternate US 77 veers to the west to serve Yoakum and Cuero.

The southern end extends from I-37 near Corpus Christi to Harlingen, where it merges with US 83 and runs through the cities of Harlingen, San Benito and Brownsville to its southern terminus at the United States/Mexico border.

A section of US 77 located in the Giddings, Texas area is known as the Martin Luther King Jr. Memorial Highway.

Another section of US 77, from I-37 to SH 44 in Nueces County, was redesignated I-69/US 77 in 2011.

As of 2017, US 77 is being co-signed with I-35E as part of the reconstruction co-signed between Denton and I-635.

Oklahoma

In Oklahoma, US 77 runs north–south, paralleling I-35, connecting Texas to Kansas and running for  through the central part of the state. It passes through many major cities, including Ardmore, Oklahoma City and Norman, Guthrie, and Ponca City. It has a freeway section, the Broadway Extension, connecting Oklahoma City to its northern suburb Edmond, in addition to sections that are co-flagged with I-35 and I-235.

Kansas

Between the US 40 junction and the Cowley County line is designated as a Blue Star Memorial Highway. In Cowley County, it is the Robert B. Docking Memorial Highway. Near Arkansas City it is the Walnut Valley Greenway.

From Nebraska to US 24 and from K-15 to Arkansas City, it is part of the National Highway System.

Nebraska

In Nebraska, US 77 is a major north–south artery connecting the capital city of Lincoln with outlying areas to the north and south. The highway is designated as the Homestead Expressway from Beatrice to I-80 at Lincoln. North of I-80, US 77 continues as an expressway to Wahoo, where it becomes a two-lane undivided road. It remains a two-lane highway except for two sections near Fremont, which are four-lane divided highways. The expressway north of Fremont is shared with US 275 and Nebraska Highway 91. US 275 and NE 91 separate from US 77 just south of Winslow, and US 77 continues north as a two-lane highway until it meets US 75 at Winnebago. The two highways run together to the junction of I-129 and US 20 at Dakota City, where US 75 breaks off and US 77 continues northward as a divided highway through South Sioux City before exiting the state via the Siouxland Veterans Memorial Bridge.

Iowa

US 77 barely enters Iowa. After crossing the Missouri River via the Veteran's Bridge at Sioux City, the highway ends at a diamond interchange with I-29.

History

US 77 previously extended north through South Dakota to Ortonville, Minnesota. It followed the current I-29 corridor up to the Toronto, South Dakota area, and then followed current South Dakota Highway 15 north to Milbank, South Dakota. After reaching Milbank, it traveled to the east, concurrently with US 12 to Ortonville, where it ended at an intersection with US 75. The segment between Milbank and Ortonville was decommissioned in 1966; the remaining South Dakota portion along with most of the highway's length in Iowa section was removed in October 1981. Portions of the old highway in the Sioux Falls, South Dakota area exist today as South Dakota Highway 115, and further north, as Moody County Road 77 and Brookings County Road 77.

Future
US 77 is currently being upgraded between the Mexican border in Brownsville to Victoria, Texas, as I-69E.

Major intersections
Texas
  at the Veterans International Bridge at Los Tomates at the Mexico–United States border in Brownsville. US 77/US 83 travels concurrently to Harlingen.
  in Brownsville. The highways travel concurrently to north of Raymondville.
  in Brownsville
  in Harlingen
  in Robstown. The highways travel concurrently to Corpus Christi.
  in Corpus Christi. I-37/US 77 travels concurrently to west-northwest of Corpus Christi.
  north of Sinton
  in Refugio
  south-southwest of Victoria. US 59/US 77 travels concurrently to southwest of Victoria.
  in Victoria
  in Schulenburg
  in Schulenburg
  in Giddings
  in Rockdale
  southeast of Cameron. The highways travel concurrently to Cameron.
  in Waco. The highways travel concurrently to northeast of Hillsboro.
  in Bellmead
  in Waxahachie
  in Waxahachie
  in Red Oak. The highways travel concurrently to Denton.
  in Dallas
  in Dallas. The highways travel concurrently through Dallas.
  in Dallas
  in Dallas
  in Dallas
  in Carrollton
  in Lewisville
  in Denton. The highways travel concurrently through Denton.
  in Denton
  in Denton. The highways travel concurrently to south of Thackerville, Oklahoma.
  in Gainesville
Oklahoma
  in Ardmore
  north of Springer
  in Davis
  in Norman. The highways travel concurrently to Oklahoma City.
  in Oklahoma City. US-62/US-77 travels concurrently through Oklahoma City.
  in Oklahoma City. I-235/US-77 travels concurrently through Oklahoma City.
  in Oklahoma City
  in Edmond. The highways travel concurrently to Guthrie.
  in Perry
  in Perry. The highways travel concurrently through Perry.
  north of Perry
  in Tonkawa. The highways travel concurrently to Ponca City.
  east-northeast of Tonkawa. The highways travel concurrently to Ponca City.
Kansas
  in Arkansas City. The highways travel concurrently through Arkansas City.
  in Winfield
  in Augusta. US-54/U-77 travels concurrently to El Dorado. US 77/US 400 travels concurrently to Pickrell Corner.
  north of El Dorado
  in Florence. The highways travel concurrently around a roundabout in Florence.
  east-northeast of Marion. The highways travel concurrently to east of Herington.
  in Junction City.
  north of Riley. The highways travel concurrently to east of Riley.
  in Marysville. The highways travel concurrently through Marysville.
Nebraska
  in Beatrice
  in Lincoln
  in Lincoln. The highways travel concurrently to north-northeast of Lincoln.
  in Lincoln
  north of Fremont. US 77/US 275 travels concurrently to south of Winslow.
  in Winnebago. The highways travel concurrently to South Sioux City.
  in South Sioux City
Iowa
  in Sioux City

See also

Related U.S. Routes
 U.S. Route 177
 U.S. Route 277
 U.S. Route 377

Bannered and suffixed routes
 U.S. Route 77 Alternate (Texas)
 U.S. Route 77 Alternate Business (Yoakum, Texas)
 U.S. Route 77 Business (Waco, Texas)

References

External links

 Endpoints of U.S. Highway 77
 Kansas Highway Maps: Current, Historic, KDOT

 
77
77
77
077